In Concert is a live album by Janis Joplin. It was released in 1972, after Joplin's death, as a double-LP record. The first record contains performances with Big Brother and the Holding Company and the second with the Full Tilt Boogie Band, recorded at various locations in 1968 and 1970. The album lacks any live recordings with her first solo effort with the Kozmic Blues band though songs that had been produced with that band were performed in the recordings of the Full Tilt Boogie Band. The photographs used for the gatefold album were taken by photographer David Gahr in New York City in 1969 and 1970.

Content
The live performances of "Down on Me" and "Ball and Chain" included on the double album would appear on Janis Joplin's Greatest Hits album a year later. Two songs, "All Is Loneliness" and "Ego Rock", were performed April 4, 1970 when Joplin reunited with Big Brother & the Holding Company over a year after leaving the group, to perform at the Fillmore West venue in San Francisco. While the recordings with Big Brother and the Holding Company were taken from various performances from 1968 and 1970, the entire live recordings with the Full Tilt Boogie Band were performed at the Festival Express in Toronto and Calgary in Canada on June 28, and July 4, 1970, respectively.

On the original copies of the album side one was backed with side four, and side two backing side three, which was relatively common with multi-LP albums to promote automatic record changers.

Critical reception

William Ruhlmann of AllMusic gave a positive review of the performances on the double-LP record, highlighting Joplin's raw vocal performance and her delivery of describing her life through her performance to her audience. He also cited various parts of the record as "moving, parts are heart-breaking, and the rest is just great rock & roll". 

Lester Bangs of the RollingStone gave a mixed review, describing the recordings as "second-rate", but compliments the energy delivered with the performances, stating; "Everyone is having a ball no matter how sloppy the music gets; in fact its sense of errant energy with no place to go but up is part of its power. Janis, the band, the audience, all feeding off of each other and giving back as much as they can of what they get." Bangs also noted that Joplin's increasing deterioration was "graphically" apparent in the recordings, stating; "On the record, we hear her as she gradually passes from the tailend of the initial exuberant phase with Big Brother, through the jarring difference between that on-stage persona and what emerges immediately in the Full-Tilt Boogie Band tapes, on which we hear a disoriented and thoroughly pathetic individual and a music whose raggedness is made even less palatable by the breakdown and sense of strain behind it."

Charts

Track listing

Personnel
Janis Joplin vocals with:
Big Brother and the Holding Company (Side A and B)
James Gurleyguitar
Sam Andrewguitar
Peter Albinbass
Dave Getzdrums
Nick Gravenitesvocal duet on "Ego Rock"
Full Tilt Boogie Band (Side C and D)
John Tillguitar
Richard Bellpiano
Ken Pearsonorgan
Brad Campbellbass
Clark Piersondrums
Technical
Fred Catero, David Dillar, Dan Healy, Owsley, Don Puluse, Larry Keyes, Tim Geelanrecording
Elliot Mazercompilation
David Gahrcover photography

References

1972 live albums
Janis Joplin albums
Live albums published posthumously
Columbia Records live albums